Francesco Bonami (b. Florence, 1955) is an Italian art curator and writer who is currently Honorary Director of Fondazione Sandretto Re Rebaudengo in Turin. He lives in Milan and Manhattan, New York.

Life and career

Bonami was born in Florence. He studied Set and Theatre Design at the Accademia di Belle Arti di Firenze. After a brief spell as an artist in Milan, Bonami relocated to New York City in 1991 where he was appointed U.S. Editor of Flash Art magazine, a post he held until 1998. From 1999 to 2008 he was Manilow Senior Curator at the Museum of Contemporary Art, Chicago and Artistic Director of Fondazione Pitti Discovery in Florence and Fondazione Sandretto Re Rebaudengo in Turin. From 2004 through 2008 he was Artistic Director of the Villa Manin Contemporary Art Center in Codroipo, Italy. He directed the 2nd edition of the SITE Santa Fe Biennial in 1997, the 50th Venice Biennale in 2003, and was one of the curators of Manifesta 3 (2000) and the 2010 Whitney Biennial.

Bonami has also organised exhibitions at the Whitechapel Art Gallery (London), the Hayward Gallery (London), the Pinault Collection (Venice), the Walker Art Center (Minneapolis), the Musée d'Art Moderne de la Ville de Paris, the Hara Museum of Contemporary Art in Tokyo, the Qatar Museums Authority in Doha, Mudam in Luxembourg and the JNBY Foundation in Hangzhou.

In 2013 Bonami wrote in La Stampa that the Venice City Council decision to remove the "Boy with Frog" sculpture by Charles Ray from the front of the Punta della dogana was "administrative cowardice" and that the lamppost which replaced it represented "a moment of cultural darkness".

Publications
Bonami has authored monographs on the work of Doug Aitken, Gabriele Basilico, Vanessa Beecroft, Glenn Brown, Maurizio Cattelan, Dan Colen, Thomas Demand, Damien Hirst, Jeff Koons, Luisa Lambri, Albert Oehlen, Gabriel Orozco, Marjetica Potrč, Carol Rama, Rudolf Stingel and Jeff Wall, amongst others.

Auction activities
In October 2014, Bonami presented a partially available for sale exhibition of contemporary sculpture at Phillips in London. The following year, he organised an auction of 50 works of Italian art at Phillips New York, including Paola Pivi, Roberto Cuoghi and Maurizio Cattelan.

Other activities
 Gagosian Gallery, Member of the Board of Directors (since 2022)

References

Italian art critics
Italian art curators
Living people
1955 births
Venice Biennale artistic directors
Accademia di Belle Arti di Firenze alumni